Maksim Chulkov (born February 23, 1988) is a Russian male acrobatic gymnast. He is a World Championships gold medalist (2008),  two-time World Championships bronze medalist (2012, 2014).

References

External links
 

1988 births
Living people
Russian acrobatic gymnasts
Male acrobatic gymnasts
Medalists at the Acrobatic Gymnastics World Championships
People from Volgodonsk
Sportspeople from Rostov Oblast
21st-century Russian people